Marco's Greatest Gamble is a 1926 German silent comedy film directed by Franz Seitz and starring Joe Stöckel, Maria Mindzenty and Walter Slezak.

It was made at the Emelka Studios in Munich. The sets were designed by Ludwig Reiber.

Cast
 Joe Stöckel as Marcco
 Maria Mindzenty
 Walter Slezak

References

Bibliography
 Quinlan, David. Quinlan's Illustrated Directory of Film Character Actors. Batsford, 1995.

External links

1926 films
Films of the Weimar Republic
Films directed by Franz Seitz
German silent feature films
German black-and-white films
German comedy films
1926 comedy films
Bavaria Film films
Films shot at Bavaria Studios
Silent comedy films
1920s German films
1920s German-language films